Dorji Wangchuk (born 1967) is the professor for Tibetan (Buddhist) Studies at the Department of Indian and Tibetan Studies, Asien-Afrika-Institut, Universität Hamburg, Germany, and is a contemporary Tibetologist and a Buddhologist.

After completing a nine-year course in the study of Tibetan Buddhism from a traditional Tibetan Buddhist monastic seminary in South India (i.e. Ngagyur Nyingma Institute, Bylakuppe, Mysore), Dorji Wangchuk studied Classical Indology (first major, with a focus on Buddhist studies and Tibetology (second major) at the University of Hamburg (MA 2002). He wrote his doctoral dissertation on “The Resolve to Become a Buddha: A Study of the Bodhicitta Concept in Indo-Tibetan Buddhism” and received his PhD from the same university in 2005.

Between 1992 and 1996, he taught Tibetan Buddhist monks and nuns in monastic seminaries in India. Since 1998, he has been teaching and researching at the University of Hamburg in various capacities. He also taught a term each at the University of Copenhagen, McGill University, and  Renmin University of China. Currently he is a professor for Tibetology (“Tibetan (Buddhist) Studies”) at the Department of Indian and Tibetan Studies, Asien-Afrika-Institut, Universität Hamburg. He is also the founder and director of the Khyentse Center for Tibetan Buddhist Textual Scholarship (KC-TBTS), a research center within the Department of Indian and Tibetan Studies, Asien-Afrika-Institut, Universität Hamburg.

His main teaching and research interests lie in Tibetan Buddhist philosophy, Tibetan intellectual history and history of ideas, and Tibetan Buddhist intellectual/literary/textual culture. Currently he is working on the perception and reception of Yogācāra in Tibet and on the identity, superiority, and authenticity issues of the Vidhyādharapiṭaka in Tibetan Buddhism.

Works 

 2014. “Where Buddhas and Siddhas Meet: Mi-pham’s Yuganaddhavāda Philosophy.” In Zhentong Reconsidered: Perspectives on the Buddhist Discourse in India and Tibet, edited by Klaus-Dieter Mathes and Michael Sheehy. New York: State University of New York Press, 2014 [in press].  
 2014. “The Diachronic and Synchronic Relationship between Philosophical Theory and Spiritual Praxis in Buddhism: With Special Reference to the Case of the Four Applications of Mindfulness (smṛtyupasthāna: dran pa nye bar gzhag pa) in Vajrayāna.” In Buddhist Meditative Praxis: Traditional Teachings and Modern Application. Hong Kong: Centre of Buddhist Studies, The University of Hong Kong, 2014, 25 pages [in press].
 2014. “Biblioclasm/Libricide in the History of Tibetan Buddhism” [forthcoming].
 2014. “On the Identity and Authenticity of the *Sarvadharmacaryopadeśābhisamayatantra: A Tantric Scripture Associated with the Vikramashila Tradition” (forthcoming), 12 pages.  
 2013. “On the Status of the Yogācāra School in Tibetan Buddhism.” In The Foundation for Yoga Practitioners: The Buddhist Yogācārabhūmi Treatise and Its Adaption in India, East Asia, and Tibet, edited by Ulrich Timme Kragh. Harvard Oriental Series 75. Cambridge, Massachusetts: Harvard University Press, pp. 1316–1328.
 2012. “Was Mi-pham a Dialectical Monist? On a Recent Study of Mi-pham’s Interpretation of the Buddha-Nature Theory.” Indo-Iranian Journal 55, 2012, pp. 15–38.
  2009. “A Relativity Theory of the Purity and Validity of Perception in Indo-Tibetan Buddhism.” In Yogic Perception, Meditation, and Altered States of Consciousness, edited by Eli Franco in collaboration with Dagmar Eigner. Vienna: Austrian Academy of Sciences, pp. 215–237.
  2008. “Cross-Referential Clues for a Relative Chronology of Klong chen pa’s Works.” In Contributions to Tibetan Buddhist Literature. PIATS 2006: Tibetan Studies: Proceedings of the Eleventh Seminar of the International Association for Tibetan Studies, edited by Orna Almogi. Königswinter, 2006. Beiträge zur Zentralasienforschung. Halle: International Institute for Tibetan and Buddhist Studies, 2008, pp. 195–244.
  2008. Review [of Jörg Grafe, Vidyādharas: Früheste Zeit kaschmirischen Bṛhatkathā. Frankfurt am Main; Berlin; Bern; Bruxelles; New York; Oxford; Vienna: Peter Lang, Europäischer Verlag der Wissenschaften, 2001]. Tantric Studies 1, 2008, pp. 220–222.
 The Resolve to Become a Buddha: A Study of the Bodhicitta Concept in Indo-Tibetan Buddhism. Studia Philologica Buddhica Monograph Series 23. Tokyo: International Institute for Buddhist Studies, 2007.
 2006. “Das dPal-yul–Kloster in Geschichte und Gegenwart: Die Wiederbelebung einer klösterlichen Tradition der rNying-ma–Schule.” In Buddhismus in Geschichte und Gegenwart 11. Hamburg: Universität Hamburg, pp. 213–234.
  2006. “Die vier buddhistische Traditionen Tibets: Teil 1: Die Nyingmapas.” Tibet und Buddhismus 20/78. Hamburg: Tibetan Center, pp. 24–28.
  2004. “The rÑiṅ-ma Interpretations of the Tathāgatagarbha Theory.” Wiener Zeitschrift für die Kunde Südasiens 48, pp. 171–213 [appeared in 2005].
  2003. “Einige philosophische Grundlagen der rDzogs-chen Meditation.” In Buddhismus in Geschichte und Gegenwart 8. Hamburg: Universität Hamburg, pp. 165–181.
  2003. gSang snying mdzod lde’i sdom byang rdo rje snying po [Synopsis of the *Guhyagarbhatantra (in verse)]. Bylakuppe, Mysore: ’Chi-med-lhun-grub, Ngagyur Nyingma Institute, 24 pp.
  2002. “An Eleventh-Century Defence of the *Guhyagarbhatantra.” In The Many Canons of Tibetan Buddhism. PIATS 2000. Tibetan Studies, edited by Helmut Eimer & David Germano. Leiden/Boston/Cologne: Brill, pp. 265–291.
  2001. “Die große Vollendung wie sie in Rong-zom-pa’s Werk dargestellt wird.” In Buddhismus in Geschichte und Gegenwart 5. Hamburg: Universität Hamburg, pp. 41–53.
  2000. “Madhyamaka aus der Sicht der rNying-ma Tradition.” In Buddhismus in Geschichte und Gegenwart 4. Hamburg: Universität Hamburg, pp. 211–233.

References

1967 births
Living people
Bhutanese expatriates in Germany
Tibetologists
Academic staff of the University of Hamburg